Oxynoemacheilus chomanicus is a species of stone loach for the genus Oxynoemacheilus. It is found in Iranian Kurdistan.

References

chomanicus
Taxa named by Barzan Bahrami Kamangar
Taxa named by Artem Mikhailovich Prokofiev
Taxa named by Edris Ghaderi
Taxa named by Teodor T. Nalbant
Fish described in 2014